Abdul Kareem Sule (born January 20, 1975, in Kaduna) is a former Nigerian football player and current Player Agent.

Career
He began his career in 1993 with his homeclub NUB Kaduna (Nigeria Universal Bank) before leaving in 1994 to Stationery Stores F.C. in Lagos. He was transferred in July 1995 to BCC Lions. After six months, he left BCC Lions and moved to Qatar SC. With the Doha club he was one of the top scorers and was scouted by Danish side Herning Fremad in 1997. He played three years for Herning before moving in 2000 for a then-Danish record nine million DKK to Akademisk Boldklub, where he played five years for the club. He left in 2004 and signed a contract with Køge BK.

He left the club after one year  and moved to AC Horsens in 2005. The next year he transferred to Lolland-Falster Alliancen. In 2007 the striker played in the Malaysian Super League for newcomers Johor FC.

International career
He played ten games and scored two goals in Africa Cup and World Cup matches for the Super Eagles and was in the squad from 1990 to 1993.

After his retirement
Later in 2008 the former Nigerian National Team player joined European Sports management (ESM) as an associated football scout.

References 

1975 births
Living people
Sportspeople from Kaduna
Association football midfielders
Nigerian footballers
Qatar SC players
Akademisk Boldklub players
Køge Boldklub players
AC Horsens players
FC Midtjylland players
Plateau United F.C. players
Danish Superliga players
Danish 1st Division players
Nigerian expatriate footballers
Expatriate footballers in Qatar
Expatriate men's footballers in Denmark
Expatriate footballers in Malaysia
Nigerian expatriate sportspeople in Qatar
Nigerian expatriate sportspeople in Denmark
Nigerian expatriate sportspeople in Malaysia
BCC Lions F.C. players
Qatar Stars League players
Nigeria international footballers
Stationery Stores F.C. players
Johor Darul Ta'zim F.C. players
Sports agents